The King of Kreuzberg (German: Der König von Kreuzberg)  is a 1990 German film by Matthias Drawe set in Berlin-Kreuzberg, a district of Berlin that has one of the largest concentration of Turks outside Turkey.

Plot summary

The young Turk R. (Rasit Tuncay), who lives in Berlin-Kreuzberg, believes that he can rise from the ground by mere concentration. Initially he briefly succeeds in a public park, but unfortunately, no one has seen it.

Being sure of his special powers, he tries it again, even in the most unsuitable situations: He assumes his take-off position, standing on one leg, arms outstretched wide. This strange pose eventually gets him into trouble with almost everyone including his girlfriend — who kicks him out.

As a consequence, R. sleeps on a park bench, his meager belongings in a suitcase. Still, he tries to rise whenever he feels the urge — which lands him in an insane asylum. His only remaining friend M. (Matthias Drawe) eventually gets him out.

Subsequently, R. and his sidekick M. try to raise funds through questionable endeavors by using a "magical ATM card" and fixing a horse race at the race track. Unfortunately, with meager success and the cops at their heels.

Eventually R., renounces his "special powers," returns to bourgeois life, and marries his girlfriend. But the next morning the infallible urge is there again, stronger than ever: R. rushes into the open and assumes his take-off position ...

Cast

Rasit Tuncay as R.  
Kerstin Rehberg as L.		
Matthias Drawe as M.	
Mersedeh Tschandarabi as C.  
Olmo Pini as the child
Simone Spörl as girl at bar 
Fehim as the doctor
Ahmet Karabolut as hairdresser
Tanju Bilgin as the psychiatrist
Sehri Yavuz as the nurse
Al Hassan Wade as the quack

Awards

The King of Kreuzberg was nominated for the 1991 :de:Filmfestival Max Ophüls Preis (Max Ophüls Award)

References

External links
The King of Kreuzberg at Internet Movie Database

The King of Kreuzberg at filmportal.de

1990 comedy films
1990 films
German comedy films
1990s German-language films
Films set in Berlin
1990s German films